Xanthodaphne contarinii is an extinct species of sea snail, a marine gastropod mollusk in the family Raphitomidae.

Description

Distribution
Fossils of this marine species were found in Pliocene strata of Emilia-Romagna, Italy.

References

 Petracci P., Bongiardino C., Della Bella G. & Tabanelli C. (2019). Xanthodaphne contarinii n.sp. dai depositi pliocenici dell'Emilia-Romagna (Gastropoda: Caenogastropoda: Raphitomidae). Quaderno di Studi e Notizie di Storia Naturale della Romagna. 50: 1-11

contarinii
Gastropods described in 2019